Robert Harrington may refer to:

Politicians
 Robert Harrington (MP for St Ives), MP for St Ives 1559
 Robert Harrington (died 1399), MP for Leicestershire 1393 and Rutland 1384
 Robert Harrington (MP for Lancashire), MP for Lancashire

Others
 Robert George Harrington (1904–1987), astronomer, worked at Palomar Observatory
 Robert Sutton Harrington (1942–1993), astronomer, worked at the US Naval Observatory
 Robert Harrington (philanthropist) (1589–1654),  bequests are part of the Bourne United Charities
 Bob Harrington (1912–?), jazz musician